Forum is an album by Australian guitar pop group Invertigo. The album was released on 16 July 2001 with some tracks recorded in the previous year. It peaked at No. 11 on the ARIA Albums Chart. Three singles were issued ahead of the album, "Desensitized" (No. 29, June 2000), "Chances Are..." (No. 19, December 2000) and "Say You Do" (No. 31, June 2001).

Track listing

All songs written by James and Vincent Leigh, except as indicated.

 "Desensitized" – 4:06
 "Chances Are..." – 4:40
 "Man Enough" – 3:34
 "Say You Do" – 4:29
 "What If It's Me" – 3:38
 "If I" – 4:14
 "Blame It on the Stars" – 4:30
 "It's Getting Personal" – 5:07
 "Slave" (James Leigh, Vincent Leigh, Gerome Leigh) – 4:56
 "Typical" – 5:19
 "Damage Control" – 3:43

Personnel
 Christian Argenti – lead vocals
 Vincent Leigh – drums
 Gerry Leigh – guitar
 James Leigh – guitar, vocals, keyboards

Charts

References

2001 albums
Invertigo albums